Fernando Feliciano "Sonny" Racimo Belmonte Jr., KGCR (born October 2, 1936) is a Filipino politician who served as a member of the Philippine House of Representatives for the Fourth District of Quezon City from 1992 to 2001 and from 2010 to 2019. He was the Speaker of the House of Representatives of the Philippines from January to June 2001 and from 2010 to 2016. He also served as the Mayor of Quezon City from 2001 to 2010, where he was hailed Most Outstanding City Mayor of the Philippines.

Early life and career
Belmonte was born at 1:35 PM on October 2, 1936, at Emmanuel Community Hospital in Tondo, Manila to judge Feliciano Belmonte Sr. and Luz Racimo. Belmonte began studying at age seven and he attended grade school in Baguio and earned his high-school diploma at the San Beda University in Manila. He finished Law at the Lyceum of the Philippines University; while in law school, he worked as a reporter at the Manila Chronicle, covering the police beat and events at the Philippine Commission on Elections.

Belmonte began his government service as the presidential staff assistant of President Diosdado Macapagal. He also worked as a special assistant for the Commissioner of Customs, and as an executive assistant at the Central Bank of the Philippines. In 1986, President Corazon Aquino assigned him to head various financially struggling government-owned corporations. He became president and General Manager of the Government Service Insurance System (GSIS) and the Manila Hotel and chairman of the National Reinsurance Corporation of the Philippines. He also represented the government as member of the board of directors of the San Miguel Corporation and the Philippine Long Distance Telephone Company (PLDT). More importantly, he assumed the position of president and chief executive officer of Philippine Airlines, which was then wholly owned by the Philippine government.

House of Representatives (1992–2001)
Belmonte was first elected as member of the House of Representatives from Quezon City's fourth congressional district. He held his House seat for three consecutive terms, from 1992 to 2001. Belmonte was Speaker of the House of Representatives in 2001, and also served as House Minority Leader. In his first two terms, he was the Vice Chairman of the Committee on Appropriations.

During his term as Congressman, he authored and co-authored several major bills, among them:
The General Appropriations Act,
The Act Providing for a Dual System of Education,
The Act Creating the Metropolitan Manila Development Authority, and
The Salary Standardization Law.

Although largely concerned with budget and financial matters, Belmonte also did work for the low-salaried employees, and was instrumental in the passage of the Second Salary Standardization Law (SSL 2), which corrected the gross inequities of SSL 1. He also pushed for the continued implementation of the Personal Economic Relief Alliance (PERA) for low-salaried government personnel.

Speaker of the House (2001)
Belmonte gained national prominence as the lead prosecutor in the impeachment trial of President Joseph Estrada. On January 20, 2001, during the EDSA Revolution of 2001, Estrada left the Malacañan Palace and Vice President Gloria Macapagal Arroyo was sworn to the presidency at the EDSA Shrine by Chief Justice Hilario Davide Jr. Accompanying Davide were the chairs of the two houses of Congress, Aquilino Pimentel Jr. and Fuentebella. Four days later, on January 24, the Arroyo allies mustered enough votes to unseat Fuentebella, replacing him with Belmonte.

Mayor of Quezon City (2001–2010)
On August 4, 2000, Belmonte formally announced his intention to run for Mayor of Quezon City, with Herbert Bautista as his intended running mate. In 2001, he won the election for the position of mayor, and was re-elected in 2004 and in 2007. As Mayor of Quezon City, his nine years of prudent fiscal management, aggressive tax management strategies, as well as increasing efficiency and growing discipline in the management, and use of City resources has made Quezon City the most competitive city of Metro Manila, and second in the Philippines today. These are rankings made by businessmen in the Philippines in studies of the Asian Institute of Management, in cooperation with international agencies.
Quezon City was cited for the dynamism of its local economy, the quality of life of its residents, and the responsiveness of the local government in addressing business and other needs.

In 2007, Quezon City was ranked No. 7 Asian City of the Future, based on a survey commissioned by the London Financial Times, through a consultancy based in Singapore.

In a 2008 Tholons special report on global services, Quezon City ranked as the number 21 emerging global outsourcing city, the highest among all nine new entrants.

Belmonte was a long-standing member of the administration Lakas-Kampi-CMD party from his first term in Congress in 1992 until November 2009, where he last held the position of senior vice president for externals. On November 19, 2009, he and his vice mayor, Herbert Bautista, were sworn in as members of the opposition Liberal Party.

House of Representatives and Speaker of the House (2010–2016)
After serving as Mayor of Quezon City, Belmonte made a successful bid for a fourth term in the House of Representatives. At the opening of the 15th Congress, Belmonte was again elected as Speaker of the House, defeating Edcel Lagman of the former ruling party Lakas Kampi CMD, with a vote of 227–29. He succeeded Prospero Nograles, whose term had ended almost a month earlier.

Personal life
Belmonte was a member of the Manila Jaycees, the Rotary Club of Manila and the Knights of Rizal. He was also Junior Chamber International World President in 1976.

He was married to Betty Go-Belmonte (1934–1994), founder of The Philippine Star. They have raised four children: Isaac, Kevin, Miguel and Joy. Their three sons have also held editorial and managerial positions at the Philippine Star and its sister publications like Pilipino Star Ngayon and Pang-Masa tabloids published in the Filipino vernacular, as well as the Cebu-based newspaper The Freeman. His daughter, Joy, is the incumbent Mayor of Quezon City since 2019. Belmonte also has a nephew, Kit, who served as a representative from Quezon City's 6th congressional district from 2013 to 2022.

References

|-

|-

|-

|-

|-

1936 births
Living people
Filipino Protestants
Ilocano people
Junior Chamber International
Lakas–CMD politicians
Liberal Party (Philippines) politicians
Lyceum of the Philippines University alumni
Mayors of Quezon City
Members of the House of Representatives of the Philippines from Quezon City
Minority leaders of the House of Representatives of the Philippines
People from Quezon City
Speakers of the House of Representatives of the Philippines
Tagalog people